Patrick Body (born January 17, 1982) was a former professional gridiron football cornerback and safety free agent. He was signed by the Cincinnati Bengals as an undrafted free agent in 2005. He played college football at Toledo.

Body was also a member of the Minnesota Vikings, Detroit Lions and Winnipeg Blue Bombers.
He has one son, Patrick Body Jr who attends Gateway High School. Patrick Body Jr is a 3 Star DB in the class of 2022 who holds multiple division 1 offers.

Early years
Body attended Schenley High School and was a student and a letterman in football. In football, he played wide receiver and defensive back and as a senior, he led his team to the first City Championship in 49 years and was an All-City League selection and an All-City League Academic selection.

Professional career
On February 15, 2010, Body was assigned to the Utah Blaze of the Arena Football League.

References

External links
Just Sports Stats
Detroit Lions bio

1982 births
Living people
American football cornerbacks
American football safeties
Canadian football defensive backs
American players of Canadian football
Players of American football from Pennsylvania
Toledo Rockets football players
Cincinnati Bengals players
Minnesota Vikings players
Detroit Lions players
Winnipeg Blue Bombers players
Utah Blaze players